iDonate is an online fundraising platform for charities and non profit organisations in Ireland.  It was launched in 2011, and available to charities and nonprofit organisations in Ireland.

Formation and organisation 
iDonate was formed in 2013 by entrepreneur Alan Coyne. Coyne was then technical director with Western Webs in Tuam, County Galway, and later developed the iCrowdFund crowdfunding website and a micro-donations app.

iDonate is a private company, and is a member of Fundraising Ireland, the association for professional fundraisers in Ireland.

The company has used the slogan 'Making Giving Easier' in their radio advertising campaigns.

iDonate was a recipient of the SCCUL Entrepreneurship Social Enterprises Award in 2012, was a regional finalist in the Ulster Bank Business Achievers Awards in 2013, and was featured by Silicon Republic as "Tech Start-up of the Week" in July 2013.

In 2019, iDonate's Charity Tax Back service introduced electronic signatures on CHY3/4 Charitable Donation Scheme forms. In 2020, it launched an online raffle creator. In 2022, the company launched a personal fundraising & crowdfunding service.

Services 
The services available on the iDonate fundraising platform include :
 iDonate - a fundraising service for registered charities and trusts in Ireland.
 iFundraise Fundraising - for nonprofits who do not have charitable status, such as schools, sports clubs, community groups and individual causes.
 Charity Tax Back - a service to remind donors if they reach the threshold which allows tax relief on charitable donations.
 Take The Challenge - a service to nominate people to do a fundraising challenge.
 Virtual event support for fundraisers 
 iRegister - an event registration system
 TENDO Giving - a micro-donations app.
 Crowdfunding for personal fundraising and once-off fundraisers.

References

External links 
 iDonate website

Irish fundraising websites
Non-profit organisations based in the Republic of Ireland
Crowdfunding platforms